The  black brotula (Stygnobrotula latebricola), also known as the black widow, is a species of viviparous brotula found in reefs of the western Atlantic Ocean where it occurs from the Bahamas in the north southwards to Brazil.  This species grows to a length of  TL.  This species is the only known member of its genus.

References

Bythitidae
Monotypic fish genera
Fish of the Atlantic Ocean
Fish described in 1957
Fish of the Caribbean
Fish of the Dominican Republic